The Minister for London is a United Kingdom Government ministerial post in the Department for Levelling Up, Housing and Communities. The officeholder is responsible for policy relating to London including informing Members of Parliament in the House of Commons on the activities of the Greater London Authority. The role is currently held by Paul Scully, who was appointed on 13 February 2020.

History
London had been under the authority of the London County Council and then the Greater London Council, but Margaret Thatcher abolished the GLC in 1986 after clashes with its leader, Ken Livingstone. Most of the municipal powers were then devolved to the 32 individual boroughs. Under John Major, however, the need for more centralised organisation was addressed by a series of moves. John Gummer was appointed Minister of London concurrently with his tenure as Secretary of State for Environment, and in 1994 the Government Office for London was established. After Tony Blair entered office, the Labour government set up an elected Mayor of London. This office, along with a reconstituted Greater London Authority, worked with the Minister and the Government Office.

The post was scrapped by David Cameron after he came to office in 2010. In 2016 however, the post was revived by Theresa May and was assigned to Gavin Barwell.

List of Ministers for London

Colour key (for political parties):

Shadow Minister
The position of Shadow Minister for London was retained by Labour under the leadership of Ed Miliband, and was held by Sadiq Khan throughout Miliband's leadership. However, since Khan's nomination as Labour's candidate for Mayor of London and Jeremy Corbyn's leadership, the office has remained vacant.

See also 
Regional minister

Notes

References

Politics of London
Ministerial offices in the United Kingdom
Lists of government ministers of the United Kingdom
1994 establishments in the United Kingdom